Johan Messchaert (22 August 18579 September 1922) was a Dutch baritone singer and vocal pedagogue.

Messchaert was born as Johannes Martinus Messchaert in Hoorn, Netherlands. He was known for his rendering of the role of Christ in Bach's St Matthew Passion, and he sang the bass role at the 18 May 1902 Düsseldorf performance of Edward Elgar's The Dream of Gerontius under the direction of Julius Buths and alongside Muriel Foster.

He later founded his own conservatoire in Amsterdam.

He died in Küsnacht, Switzerland in 1922, aged 65.

Notes 

1857 births
1922 deaths
Dutch operatic baritones
Dutch music educators
Voice teachers
People from Hoorn
19th-century Dutch male singers
19th-century Dutch opera singers